Belarus competed at the 2012 Summer Paralympics in London, United Kingdom from August 29 to September 9, 2012.

Medalists

Athletics 

Men's Field Events

Women's Track and Road Events

Women's Field Events

Cycling

Road

Women

Track

Individual Pursuit

Judo

Powerlifting 

Women

Rowing

Swimming 

Men

Women

Wheelchair Fencing 

Men

Women

See also

 Belarus at the 2012 Summer Olympics

References

Nations at the 2012 Summer Paralympics
2012
2012 in Belarusian sport